Armstrong's Wife is a 1915 American silent drama film directed by George Melford and written by Margaret Turnbull. The film stars Edna Goodrich, Thomas Meighan, James Cruze, Hal Clements, Ernest Joy and Raymond Hatton. The film was released on November 18, 1915, by Paramount Pictures.

This film is now lost.

Plot
The film is about a young woman who is liked by two men. She spends a few months liking one of them but she finds out he is married already. So because she was disappointed, she agrees to go out to the Canadian countryside with the other man. In the end, all three end up meeting together.

Cast 
Edna Goodrich as May Fielding
Thomas Meighan as David Armstrong
James Cruze as Harvey Arnold
Hal Clements as Jack Estabrook
Ernest Joy as Detective
Raymond Hatton as Runner
Horace B. Carpenter as Police Inspector
Mrs. Lewis McCord as Landlady

References

External links 
 

1915 films
1910s English-language films
Silent American drama films
1915 drama films
Paramount Pictures films
Films directed by George Melford
American black-and-white films
Lost American films
American silent feature films
1915 lost films
Lost drama films
1910s American films